is a former Japanese football player. he is current goalkeeper coach J1 League club of Kyoto Sanga.

Playing career
Tominaga was born in Kitakyushu on May 22, 1980. After graduating from high school, he joined J1 League club Nagoya Grampus Eight in 1999. However he could not play at all in the match behind Seigo Narazaki. In 2001, he moved to Japan Football League club Denso and played many matches. In August 2001, he returned to Nagoya Grampus Eight. However he could not play at all in the match. In 2004, he moved to J2 League club Sagan Tosu. He played many matches as regular goalkeeper until the middle of 2004. However he could hardly play in the match behind Junnosuke Schneider from late 2004. In 2007, he moved to Yokohama F. Marinos. However he could not play at all in the match behind Tetsuya Enomoto. In September 2007, he moved to Consadole Sapporo. However he could not play at all in the match behind Takahiro Takagi and Yuya Sato. He retired end of 2008 season.

Club statistics

J.League Firsts
 Appearance: April 11, 2004. Sagan Tosu 3-0 Vegalta Sendai, Tosu Stadium

References

External links

1980 births
Living people
Association football people from Fukuoka Prefecture
Japanese footballers
J1 League players
J2 League players
Japan Football League players
Nagoya Grampus players
FC Kariya players
Sagan Tosu players
Yokohama F. Marinos players
Hokkaido Consadole Sapporo players
Association football goalkeepers